St. Paul's Church is a Protestant church, built in 1864 on Manora, Karachi in Sindh, Pakistan.

It is situated beside the Manora Point Lighthouse and is managed by the Karachi Port Trust. St. Paul's was erected as a memorial to Sir Charles James Napier, the British general who led forces to conquer the Sindh in 1843. The building was recently restored in 2008.

History

The British forces under General Charles James Napier captured Manora in 1839, as part of their Sindh campaign making it their military base of operations. St. Paul's, among other buildings, was erected as a memorial to the British General. When the church was built it was constructed from limestone from the Hands' Hill Quarries (located 3 miles from Karachi and 5 from Kiamari) and the lower-grade but cheaper Manora conglomerate. It features an Early English architectural style, and consists of a nave, without aisles, a vestry and a small assembly hall. The nave is 43 feet in length and 20 feet wide, with a height up to the tie beam of 20 feet. Despite the church's simple and traditional exterior, the interior features a cathedral style ceiling of wooden trusses.  Further references to a gothic style of architecture include the church's four lancet windows, as well as the three-light stained glass windows at its eastern end. The building was completed within the year and consecrated in the following one (1865). Construction costs totalled 15,000 rupees, of which 4,000 rupees were contributed by the Government.

In the early years of St. Paul's church, the congregation was mostly made up of area residents as well as by the crews of the harbour vessels. It was designed to seat 50 persons with services conducted by one of the Government chaplains of the Karachi station every Sunday.

Throughout the church's long history, alterations have been made to the church, including the original exterior of the church being completely cemented over.

Restoration
Restoration work in two phases, due to financial restraints, was carried out on the church to preserve it as a heritage site and restore the "neglected" church to its original form. The restoration process took longer than expected, remaining pending for a year due to lack of finances before resuming and completing the final stage of work in 2008. The money for the restoration was raised privately, as no support from the government or the Karachi Port Trust was able to be given.

References

Churches in Pakistan
Churches in Karachi
Churches completed in 1864
1864 establishments in British India